American singer Beyoncé has released various music videos. Her films have grossed over $2 billion worldwide at the box office. She first appeared in the 1999 music video for Case's "Happily Ever After", after which she made her film debut as the lead in the direct-to-video musical Carmen: A Hip Hopera (2001). Beyoncé's first solo music video was the soundtrack single "Work It Out" for the Mike Myers James Bond parody film Austin Powers in Goldmember, which is also her debut theatrical feature film. After Destiny's Child—a girl group of which Beyoncé was a member—went on hiatus, she released in 2003 her first music video as a solo artist for "Crazy in Love" (featuring Jay-Z) from Dangerously in Love. It won three awards at the 2003 MTV Video Music Awards, including Best Female Video. Other videos from the album included for the singles "Baby Boy", "Me, Myself and I" and "Naughty Girl" in 2003 and 2004.

In 2006, Beyoncé starred in two films: The Pink Panther, which spawned the single "Check on It" and its pink-themed video, and the musical drama Dreamgirls, which earned her a Golden Globe Award for Best Actress nomination. From her second solo album B'Day (2006), she released the music videos for "Déjà Vu", which proved controversial, "Irreplaceable", which garnered her an MTV Video Music Award nomination, and "Beautiful Liar" with Colombian singer Shakira. Beyoncé created a video anthology for the album, with music videos for all songs. The year 2008 saw the release of her third album, I Am... Sasha Fierce, which spawned music videos for nearly all of its songs, including "If I Were a Boy", "Single Ladies (Put a Ring on It)" and "Ego". The black-and-white video for "Single Ladies" inspired a dance craze and many imitations worldwide, winning several accolades, including the MTV Video Music Award for Video of the Year. Beyoncé ended the decade with the lead role in the thriller film Obsessed (2009) and a collaboration with Lady Gaga on the video for "Video Phone"; they later worked on Gaga's "Telephone" in 2010, which was shot as a short film.

The release of Beyoncé's fourth album 4 (2011) was preceded by the music videos for its singles "Run the World (Girls)" and "Best Thing I Never Had". The latter won the MTV Video Music Award for Best Choreography and was followed by a number of other videos from 4. In 2013, Beyoncé voiced the role of Queen Tara in the animated film Epic and released her self-titled fifth effort, a "visual album", whose every track was accompanied by non-linear short films, including the MTV Video Music Award for Video of the Year-nominated "Drunk in Love" and two extra videos to accompany the two-part tracks "Haunted" and "Partition", as well as a bonus video for "Grown Woman". She reissued the album in 2014 as part of a platinum edition, which spawned videos for the new tracks, such as "7/11" and "Ring Off". "7/11" was nominated for five awards at the 2015 MTV Video Music Awards, winning for Best Editing. Other videos during this period include "Feeling Myself" with Nicki Minaj and "Hymn for the Weekend" with Coldplay in 2015 and 2016, respectively. In 2016, Beyoncé released her sixth studio album, Lemonade, accompanied by a one-hour film of same name aired on HBO. The visual earned Beyoncé nominations for Primetime Emmy Awards for Outstanding Variety Special and Outstanding Directing for a Variety Special and a Grammy Award for Best Music Film. She was nominated for 11 awards at the 2016 MTV Video Music Awards, winning eight, six for "Formation"—which also won the Grammy Award for Best Music Video—Best Female Video for "Hold Up" and Best Long Form Video for the film. She has won a total of 24 MTV Video Music Awards, more than any other artist.

Beyoncé has appeared in television shows, including in guest judging roles in American Idol and The X Factor, as well the autobiographical television film Life Is But a Dream (2013). She has also featured in several commercials, including for Pepsi, with which she signed a $50 million deal in 2013. She received some criticism for endorsing a sugary product. Among her several video albums, her 2014 concert special On the Run Tour: Beyoncé and Jay-Z was nominated for a Primetime Emmy Award for Outstanding Special Class Program and Grammy Award for Best Music Film. After her 2018 Coachella performances, Beyoncé released a documentary film of the performances on Netflix named Homecoming on April 17, 2019.

List of music videos

1999 and 2000s

2010s

2020s

Albums

Live video albums

Compilation video albums

Music video albums

Film

Television

Commercials

Notes

References

Videography
Videographies of American artists